Louis-François Beffara (23 August 1751 – 2 February 1838) was a French writer.

A commissaire de police in Paris from 1792 to 1816, he bequeathed  the Bibliothèque nationale de France his manuscripts regarding opera houses in France and abroad.

Selected works 
1777: Esprit de Molière, ou choix de maximes et portraits… tirés de ses ouvrages, 2 vol.
1821: Dissertation sur J. B. Poquelin de Molière
1835: Maison natale de Molière

References

External links 
 Louis-François Beffara on Data.bnf.fr
 Louis-François Beffara on Répertoire des arts du spectacle.

1751 births
1838 deaths
18th-century French writers
18th-century French male writers
19th-century French writers
Writers from Normandy